The UXV Combatant is a concept drone carrier warship designed by BVT Surface Fleet (now BAE Systems Maritime – Naval Ships), which was displayed at the Defence Security and Equipment International (DSEI) in 2007. UXV Combatant shares some common design features with the Type 45 destroyer.

Design

The design features two flight decks for launching unmanned aerial vehicles, V/STOL aircraft, and helicopters; arrayed in a "V" shape. To launch aircraft, it could be expected to use the Electromagnetic Aircraft Launch System or a ski-jump. It was also reported to be capable of launching unmanned underwater vehicles via a "moon pool", and in addition, able to embark a large number of troops plus their equipment. For naval gunfire support, the design is equipped with a 155 mm cannon, able to fire bursts of 20 rounds in rapid succession. It also features a vertical launching system.

Mission
UXV Combatant is designed to better meet the threats of asymmetric warfare. Able to deploy assault troops or special forces ashore with their equipment, it is designed to provide the necessary firepower to support them. Such as; land-attack cruise missile launched via its vertical launching system, its 155 mm gun, and a fleet of unmanned combat aerial vehicles. UXV Combatant is also designed to perform reconnaissance missions, with powerful ship-borne sensors and unmanned aerial vehicles. UXV Combatant is designed to act both independently, or as an escort.

Current status
This is a concept warship only, and there are currently no plans for this concept to enter design proper.

References

External links
BAE Systems press release: 11 September 2007

Proposed aircraft carriers
Proposed ships of the Royal Navy